Australians in the United Kingdom, or Australian Britons, include Australians who have become residents or citizens of the United Kingdom. The largest segment of Australia's diaspora of 1 million resides in the United Kingdom.

The 2001 UK Census recorded 107,871 Australian-born people. In that census, the highest concentration of Australians in the UK was recorded in south-west London, with sizeable communities in Earl's Court, Kensington, Hammersmith, Fulham, Shepherd's Bush and Putney. In 2007, Bloomberg reported that there were approximately 200,000 Australians in London. In 2008, The Times reported that there were 400,000 Australians in the United Kingdom. The 2011 UK Census recorded 113,592 residents born in Australia in England, 2,695 in Wales, 8,279 in Scotland, and 1,750 in Northern Ireland. Within England, the majority were resident in London (53,959) and the South East (20,242). The Office for National Statistics estimates that 138,000 people born in Australia were resident in the UK in 2017. The equivalent estimate in 2020 was 166,000.

The late-2000s recession was reported to have resulted in an increased number of Australians moving from the UK. 2,700 Australians left each month in late 2008, compared to 1,750 a month in 2005.

Notable individuals

See also

 Australia–United Kingdom relations
 Ten Pound Poms
 Little Australia
 Australian rules football in the United Kingdom

References

 
 
United Kingdom
Ethnic groups in the United Kingdom
Australia